Cornwallius is an extinct herbivorous marine mammal of the family Desmostylidae.

The type locality is the Chattian Sooke Formation, Vancouver Island, British Columbia, Canada (paleocoordinates ).

Fossils have been discovered from Baja California Peninsula, Oregon and Washington coasts, and Unalaska Island.

Notes

References

 
 
 
 

Desmostylians
Oligocene mammals
Prehistoric placental genera
Fossil taxa described in 1923
Oligocene mammals of North America